Wacław Teofil Stachiewicz (19 November 1894 – 12 November 1973) was a Polish writer, geologist, military commander and general of the Polish Army. A brother to General Julian Stachiewicz and the husband to General Roman Abraham's sister, Stachiewicz was the Chief of General Staff of the Polish Army during the Polish Defensive War of 1939.

Early life and career

Wacław Teofil Stachiewicz was born 19 November 1894, in Lwów (also known as Lemberg and L'viv), Galicia, Austria-Hungary. After graduating from one of local gymnasiums, he entered the geological faculty at the University of Lwów. In 1912, he joined the underground Związek Strzelecki, where he received military training and graduated from NCO and officer courses.

After the outbreak of the Great War in August 1914, Stachiewicz joined the Polish Legions in which he became a platoon commander in the 1st Regiment. On 9 October, he was promoted to second lieutenant and sent with a secret mission to the other side of the Russo-Austrian Front to help the creation of Polish underground organisations in the territory that was still under Russian occupation. In 1915, he was moved to the newly formed 5th Regiment in which he commanded the 4th company. Wounded at the Battle of Konary, he was moved to various staff duties, such as serving as an aide to the chief of staff of the regiment. In March 1917, he graduated from an officer course of the General Staff and was to be promoted.

Oath Crisis and rebirth of Polish Army
However, the Oath Crisis of 1917 caused Stachiewicz to be drafted into the Austro-Hungarian Army, demoted to sergeant and sent to the Italian Front. In March 1918, he defected from the army, returned to Poland and joined the secret Polish Military Organisation. He headed its central branch, based in Warsaw. After Poland regained its independence, the organization became one of the cores of the reborn Polish Armed Forces.

Initially serving as the head of the I Detachment of the General Staff and the deputy chief of staff of the Warsaw military district, Stachiewicz soon became a staff officer of General Stanisław Haller's Army. He also served in a number of roles in the Polish Ministry of War Affairs. During the Battle of Warsaw (1920), he served as a deputy chief of staff and chief of operations of General Kazimierz Sosnkowski's Volunteer Army. After the end of hostilities and the Peace of Riga, Stachiewicz returned to the ministry.

In 1921, Stachiewicz was sent to Paris, where he graduated from the École supérieure de guerre in late 1923. Upon his return, he became a professor of tactics at the Wyższa Szkoła Wojenna in Warsaw. In April 1926, he started a year of practice at the post of head of the 1st detachment of the Polish General Staff. In June 1927, he became the first officer of the Staff of the General Inspectorate of Armed Forces. In January 1928, he completed his practice as the commanding officer of the Częstochowa-based 27th Infantry Regiment. Finally, after a year of training there, he became the chief of infantry in the elite 1st Legions Infantry Division in Wilno. In December 1933, he returned to Częstochowa, this time as a commanding officer of the entire 7th Infantry Division. In 1935, he was promoted to the rank of brigadier general. After the death of Marshal of Poland, Józef Piłsudski, Stachiewicz's place was taken by General Edward Rydz-Śmigły, who nominated him for the post of the Chief of Staff of the Polish Army.

World War II, exile and death

One of the most promising staff officers in the Polish military, Stachiewicz was the author of various military plans, such as Plan Zachód, the Polish plan of operations in case of a war against Nazi Germany, and Plan Wschód, a similar plan in case of a war against the Soviet Union. He was also the officer to prepare the Polish mobilisation. In late 1939, he supervised the successful mobilisation although it was called off because of British and French pressure. After the outbreak of the Polish Defensive War, he automatically became the Chief of Staff of the headquarters of the Polish commander-in-chief. However, lack of communication made him lose any influence on the conflict, and he and Rydz-Śmigły withdrew to south-eastern Poland. After the Soviets joined the war on the side of the Nazis, he crossed the border on 18 September with Romania to continue the struggle abroad in France. However, internal struggle for power among the Polish emigres made the French pressure the Romanian authorities into interning Stachiewicz and his superior.

In January 1940, Stachiewicz managed to escape from captivity and, through Bucharest and Yugoslavia, reached the French-held port of Algiers. However, General Władysław Sikorski insisted for another internment, this time by the French, and it was not until 1943 that Stachiewicz finally reached London. There, he spent the remaining part of the war without any assignment. After World War II, he was deprived of his Polish citizenship by the Soviet-backed communist authorities of Poland and had to remain in exile.

In 1948, Stachiewicz moved to Montreal, Canada. Blamed by many for the Polish defeat in the war, Stachiewicz devoted himself to writing and wrote several books on the Polish preparations for the war of 1939.

Death and legacy
He died on 12 November 1973. The Polish Library of the McGill University is named after him.

Honours and awards
 Silver Cross of the Virtuti Militari
 Commanders of the Polonia Restituta, previously awarded the Officer's Cross
 Cross of Independence with Swords
 Cross of Valour – four times
 Gold Cross of Merit
 Knight's Cross of the Legion of Honour
 Order of the Cross of the Eagle, Class I (Estonia, 1937)

See also
 Invasion of Poland
 Second Polish Republic

Bibliography
 
 
 
 

1894 births
1973 deaths
Military personnel from Lviv
People from the Kingdom of Galicia and Lodomeria
Polish Austro-Hungarians
Polish generals
Polish male writers
20th-century Polish geologists
Polish Military Organisation members
Polish legionnaires (World War I)
Austro-Hungarian military personnel of World War I
Polish people of the Polish–Soviet War
Polish military personnel of World War II
Polish emigrants to Canada
Polish exiles
Recipients of the Silver Cross of the Virtuti Militari
Recipients of the Cross of Independence with Swords
Commanders of the Order of Polonia Restituta
Recipients of the Cross of Valour (Poland)
Recipients of the Gold Cross of Merit (Poland)
Chevaliers of the Légion d'honneur
Recipients of the Military Order of the Cross of the Eagle, Class I